The International Journal of Software Engineering and Knowledge Engineering was founded in 1991 and is published by World Scientific, covering areas relating to software engineering and knowledge engineering and the connections between the two disciplines. Topics covered include object-oriented systems, rapid prototyping, logic programming, and software and knowledge-ware maintenance.

Abstracting and indexing 
The journal is abstracted and indexed in:
 SciSearch
 ISI Alerting Services
 CompuMath Citation Index
 Inspec
 io-port.net
 Compendex
 Computer Abstracts

Publications established in 1991
Computer science journals
World Scientific academic journals
English-language journals
Software engineering publications
Knowledge engineering